Piotr Cybulski (born 19 April 1955 in Bierutów) is a Polish politician. He was elected to the Sejm on 25 September 2005, getting 7332 votes in 1 Legnica district as a candidate from the Civic Platform list.

See also
Members of Polish Sejm 2005-2007

External links
Piotr Cybulski - parliamentary page - includes declarations of interest, voting record, and transcripts of speeches.

1955 births
Living people
People from Bierutów
Members of the Polish Sejm 2005–2007
Law and Justice politicians
Members of the Polish Sejm 2007–2011